José María Agulló Sánchez Bellmont (1774–1824) was a Spanish nobleman, who held the titles nobiliary of Marquess of Campo-Salinas, Baron of Tamarit, Count of Ripalda and Knight of the Royal Cavalry Armory of Valencia.

Biography
Born in Xativa, Valencia, José María Agulló Sánchez Bellmont was the son of Francisco Agulló y Cebrian and Josefa Sánchez de Bellmont, belonging to noble and distinguished families of the Iberian Peninsula. He was married to Vicenta Ramón de Sentís, born in 1784 in Valencia, daughter of José Vicente Ramón de Sentís y Cascajares, I Barón de Tamarit, and Ramona Ripalda y Vidarte, born in Pamplona.

José Agulló y Sánchez Bellmont held various public positions, including as Commissioner of Agriculture régio in the province of Valencia and Castellon. His son José Joaquin Agulló y Ramon was the VI Conde de Ripalda.

References

1774 births
1824 deaths
People from Valencia
18th-century Spanish nobility
Marquesses of Spain
Date of birth unknown
Date of death unknown
19th-century Spanish nobility